Sepak takraw at the 2019 Southeast Asian Games was held at the Subic Gymnasium from 1 to 10 December 2019.

Participating nations

Medal summary

Medal table

Medalists

References

External links
 

2019
2019 Southeast Asian Games events